Ferdousi Priyabhashini (19 February 1947 – 6 March 2018) was a Bangladeshi sculptor. She was the first one to publicly announce herself as Birangona, a term coined by Sheikh Mujibur Rahman for the rape victims of the Liberation War of Bangladesh in 1971. Government of Bangladesh awarded her Independence Day Award in 2010.

Early life and career
Priyabhashini was born on 19 February 1947 in Khulna, Bangladesh to her parents Rowshan Hasina and Syed Mahbubul Hoque.
Priyabhashini was married to an artist in 1963. She had to work in a jute mill for her family. But financial problems grew and the couple got separated in 1971.

Priyabhashini later became a sculptor. Since 1990, she has exhibited her works through exhibitions. Her first exhibition was jointly inaugurated by artist SM Sultan and poet Sufia Kamal, and anchored by Syed Shamsul Haque.

The 2015 play Jamuna draws inspiration from Priyabhashini's life and artwork.

Personal life
Priyabhashini married Ahsanullah Ahmed in 1972. Together they have three sons and three daughters.

Exhibitions 
 Charupith, Jessore, 1991
 Bengal Foundation, Dhaka, 1994
 Jozon Art Gallery, Dhaka, 1994
 Bangladesh Shilpokala Academy, Dhaka, 1996
 Dhaka Art Centre Gallery, Dhaka, 1996
 Bangladesh National Museum, 1999
 Bengal Gallery of Fine Arts, Dhaka, 2002
 Shilpangan Gallery, Dhaka, 2004
 In the Deep Days of Monsoon = Emana ghanaghora barishāẏa, 2004
 Shilpangan Gallery, Dhaka, 2006
 Branches and twigs = Sā̄khā praśākhā, 2007
 Dots Gallery, Dhaka, 2007
 Bengal Gallery of Fine Arts, Dhaka, 2010
 Dhaka Art Centre, Dhaka, 2010
Light and shadow = Raudra chāẏā : duet art exhibition, 2013
Prelude to a monsoon evening = Nāmila Śrābaṇa sandhyā, 2015

Awards
 Independence Day Award (2010)
 Hero by the Reader's Digest magazine (2004)
 Chadernath Podok
 Ananna Shirshow Podok
 Silver Jubilee Award by YWCA
 Human Rights Award by Manabadhikar Sangstha

References

External links
 Ferdousi Priyabhashini’s solo sculpture exhibition starts
 Priyobhashini’s solo show begins today

1947 births
2018 deaths
People from Khulna
Bangladeshi sculptors
Modern sculptors
20th-century sculptors
Recipients of the Independence Day Award
Honorary Fellows of Bangla Academy